Alfred Loranus Atwood (1886–1965) was an American football player and coach. A college football player and graduate of Amherst College, Atwood served as the head football coach at Haverford College in 1910.

References

External links
 

1886 births
1965 deaths
American football halfbacks
Amherst Mammoths football players
Haverford Fords football coaches